Thanks To My Eyes is the first opera by the Italian Swiss composer Oscar Bianchi. It was premiered at the Festival d'Aix-en-Provence in 2011 and received its Belgian premiere at the La Monnaie in Brussels in March 2012. The same year further performances took place in Europe.
The libretto by Joël Pommerat is based on his former play Grace a mes Yeux.

Roles

Instrumentation 

Flute (C Flute, bass Flute and Piccolo), Recorder (sopranino Recorder, soprano Recorder, tenor Recorder, bass Recorder and Paetzold contrabass Recorder in F), Clarinet (Clarinet in Bb, bass Clarinet in Bb and contrabass Clarinet in Bb), Saxophone (soprano Saxophone, alto Saxophone and Eb Tubax), Trumpet in C (doubling Flugelhorn), Trombone, Percussion, Accordion, Violin, Viola, Violoncello, Contrabass, Electronics.

References

External links 
 
Trailer of Thanks to My Eyes on YouTube.
Thanks to My Eyes Live excerpts from Aix-en-Provence representations on YouTube.
Editions Durand announcement
interview of Oscar Bianchi about Thanks to My Eyes
Arte's extras
Arte's broadcast

Operas
2011 operas
Operas set in France
One-act operas
English-language operas
Operas based on plays